Josse-Émile van Dievoet (10 June 1886 – 24 June 1967) was a Flemish politician and lawyer. He served as Belgian Minister of Justice.

He was a Doctor of Law and of political and social sciences. He was also an honorary doctor of Utrecht University and Radboud University Nijmegen.

Career 
He was a lawyer at the Leuven Bar and a professor at KU Leuven. He also had a political career campaigning for the use of the Dutch language in Belgium.

He was Minister of Justice and of Agriculture.

He was a member of the Catholic Party.

He was also chairman of ASLK / CGER.

Political fights 
He fought mainly for the "dutchification" of the Law in Belgium and against the natural expansion of Brussels. He was against the incorporation of Haren to Brussels.

Family 

Émile van Dievoet is the father of:

 Jonkheer Guido van Dievoet, born 12 October 1924, professor at KU Leuven, law historian
 Jonkheer Walter van Dievoet, born 24 June 1931, expert on goldsmithing

Flemish cinematographer Valérie Baeyens, is a great grand daughter of baron van Dievoet.

Title and arms 
He was ennobled on 17 March 1967 by King Baudouin with the title of Baron.

He officially obtained hereditary nobility and personal title of Baron on 30 April 1968, after his death.

All his descendants of the same name are titled Jonkheer/Jonkvrouw .

See also 

 Van Dievoet family, a different family of the same name.
 Dievoet
 Dievoort
 List of Belgian family mottos

Bibliography 

 Cahiers d'histoire du temps présent = Bijdragen tot de eigentijdse geschiedenis, du Centre d'études et de documentation "Guerre et sociétés contemporaines" (Belgium, Centre d'études guerres et sociétés contemporaines, Publié par Centre d'études guerres et sociétés contemporaines, 2004, p. 127, 131, 132.
 Encyclopedie van het Vlaamse Beweging, I, Tielt-Utrecht, 1973, 421–422 (avec bibliographie). 
 Winkler Prins Encyclopedie van Vlaanderen, II, Bruxelles, 1973, p. 304–305 (concerne le baron Émile et le Jonkheer Guido van Dievoet).
 De Grote Oosthoek, Encyclopedie en Woordenboek, 7e édition, VI, 's-Gravenhage, 1977, 86. 
 État présent de la Noblesse du Royaume de Belgique, par Oscar Coomans de Brachène et alii, Bruxelles, 1987, p. 361–362.
 L'État présent de la noblesse belge : annuaire de 2005. Seconde partie, par le Comte Humbert de Marnix de Sainte Aldegonde, et alii.
 Intermédiaire des généalogistes, famille originaire de Ternat, 1977, 232.
 Fernand Baudhuin, L'économie belge sous l'occupation, 1940–1944, p.366.
 Robert Capelle, Au service du roi: 1940–1945, éd. C. Dessart, 1949, p.117, 277, 318.
 F. Collin, "Prof. E. Van Dievoet", dans Onze Alma mater, II, 1948, 3. 
 Alain Dantoing, La "Collaboration" du cardinal: L'Église de Belgique dans la Guerre 40–45, 1991, page 371.
 Henri Grégoire et Oscar Grojean, dans, Le Flambeau: revue belge des questions politiques et littéraires, vol. 11 pt.3 1928: "Il y a le projet de la commission ou projet Van Dievoet. M. Van Dievoet, suivi par la majorité de la commission, éteint la peine pour tous les condamnés y compris Borms
 Carl-Henrik Höjer, Le régime parlementaire belge de 1918 à 1940, 1946, p. 288. ("M. Spaak avait élargi la base linguistique de son gouvernement en y appelant deux extrémistes: le flamingant van Dievoet, etc.").
 J.Marijnen, "Nieuwe tendenties in het Vlaamsche Rechtsleven", dans, Het vlaamsche Land, 1er juillet 1943.
 Pierre Stéphany, La Flandre aux Flamands, Bruxelles, 2008, 2007.
 Georges van Hecke, Notes pour servir à l'histoire du barreau de cassation, Bruxelles, 1979, p.42.
 Leen van Molle, Chacun pour tous: le Boerenbond Belge, 1890–1990, 1990, p.318
 P. Van Molle, Le Parlement belge 1894–1969, Ledeberg, 1969, 349–350 (avec bibliographie).
 Baronne Els Witte, De Brusselse negentien gemeenten en het Brussels model, Bruxelles, 2003, p. 49: " (Emiel) Van Dievoet vreesde duidelijk dat de Vlaams-katholieke identiteit van de bevolking door de inlijving bij Brussel in de verdrukking zou komen": " Émile Van Dievoet craignait clairement que l'identité catholico-flamande de la population (de Haeren) soit soumise à pression après l'incorporation à Bruxelles"

External links 

Photograph of baron Émile van Dievoet

References 

Belgian politicians
20th-century Belgian lawyers
1886 births
1967 deaths
People from Leuven